Domien Michiels (born 21 September 1983) is a Belgian Olympic equestrian athlete. Michiels started riding at a young age at the local riding school in his birthplace Oud-Heverlee. He made his debut on international level in 2016 in Mariakalnok, Hungary. In 2018 he competed for the first time on international Grand Prix level and represented Belgium at the Nations Cup in Geesteren, Netherlands in 2019 and Compiégne, France in 2021.

Michiels represented Belgium at the Olympic Games in Tokyo.

He is openly gay.

References

External links
 
 
 

1983 births
Living people
Belgian male equestrians
Belgian dressage riders
Equestrians at the 2020 Summer Olympics
Olympic equestrians of Belgium
Gay sportsmen
LGBT equestrians
Belgium LGBT sportspeople
21st-century LGBT people